André Weis (born 30 September 1989) is a German professional footballer who plays as a goalkeeper for Fortuna Köln.

Career
On 17 February 2012, Weis extended his contract with VfB Stuttgart until June 2014. On 1 July 2013, he moved to FC Ingolstadt 04. In summer 2016, he joined 1. FC Kaiserslautern.

In 2015, he signed for FSV Frankfurt.

On 3 August 2017, Weis joined SSV Jahn Regensburg on loan for the season. After his loan from 1. FC Kaiserslautern ended at the end of the 2017–18 season, he signed a three-year-contract with Regensburg.

Failing to gain a spot in the first team in Regensburg, he joined FC Viktoria Köln in January 2020.

In 2021, he signed for Fortuna Köln.

References

External links
 
 

1989 births
Living people
People from Boppard
German footballers
Footballers from Rhineland-Palatinate
Association football goalkeepers
2. Bundesliga players
3. Liga players
SV Wilhelmshaven players
TuS Koblenz players
VfB Stuttgart II players
VfB Stuttgart players
FC Ingolstadt 04 players
FSV Frankfurt players
1. FC Kaiserslautern players
SSV Jahn Regensburg players
FC Ingolstadt 04 II players
FC Viktoria Köln players
SC Fortuna Köln players